Schumacheria alnifolia is a species of plant in the Dilleniaceae family. It is endemic to Sri Lanka.

References

Flora of Sri Lanka
Dilleniaceae
Critically endangered plants
Taxonomy articles created by Polbot